The 1985 San Francisco Giants season was the Giants' 103rd season in Major League Baseball, their 28th season in San Francisco since their move from New York following the 1957 season, and their 26th at Candlestick Park. It resulted in the team finishing in sixth place in the NL West Division with a record of 62 wins and franchise-record 100 losses.  This was the first, and as of 2022, the only time in the history of the franchise that they reached the triple-digit mark in losses. It is also the highest number of games they have lost in a season, as well. The Giants were managed by Jim Davenport, who was dismissed on September 18, after compiling a dismal 56-88 record, and Roger Craig, who guided the team to a 6-12 mark during the final 2½ weeks of the season. They finished 33 games behind the division champion and their main rival, the Los Angeles Dodgers.

Offseason
 November 5, 1984: Guy Sularz was released by the San Francisco Giants.
 December 3, 1984: Doug Gwosdz was drafted by the Giants from the San Diego Padres in the 1984 rule 5 draft.
 January 26, 1985: Gary Lavelle was traded by the Giants to the Toronto Blue Jays for Jim Gott, Augie Schmidt (minors), and Jack McKnight (minors).
 February 1, 1985: Jack Clark was traded by the Giants to the St. Louis Cardinals for Dave LaPoint, David Green, José Uribe and Gary Rajsich.

Regular season

Opening Day starters
Bob Brenly
Chris Brown
Chili Davis
Dan Gladden
David Green
Atlee Hammaker
Johnnie LeMaster
Jeffrey Leonard
Manny Trillo

Season standings

Record vs. opponents

Notable transactions
April 5, 1985: Roger Mason was traded by the Detroit Tigers to the San Francisco Giants for Alejandro Sánchez.
April 6, 1985: Vida Blue was signed as a free agent by the Giants.
April 15, 1985: Chuck Hensley was signed as a free agent with the San Francisco Giants.
April 17, 1985: John Rabb was traded by the Giants to the Atlanta Braves for Alex Treviño.
April 30, 1985: Jeff Cornell was released by the San Francisco Giants.
May 7, 1985: Mike Jeffcoat was traded by the Cleveland Indians with Luis Quinones to the San Francisco Giants for Johnnie LeMaster.
June 3, 1985: Will Clark was drafted by the Giants in the 1st round (2nd pick) of the 1985 Major League Baseball draft.
July 22, 1985: Gary Rajsich was purchased from the Giants by the St. Louis Cardinals.

Roster

Player stats

Batting

Starters by position 
Note: Pos = Position; G = Games played; AB = At bats; H = Hits; Avg. = Batting average; HR = Home runs; RBI = Runs batted in

Other batters 
Note: G = Games played; AB = At bats; H = Hits; Avg. = Batting average; HR = Home runs; RBI = Runs batted in

Pitching

Starting pitchers 
Note: G = Games pitched; IP = Innings pitched; W = Wins; L = Losses; ERA = Earned run average; SO = Strikeouts

Other pitchers 
Note: G = Games pitched; IP = Innings pitched; W = Wins; L = Losses; ERA = Earned run average; SO = Strikeouts

Relief pitchers 
Note: G = Games pitched; W = Wins; L = Losses; SV = Saves; ERA = Earned run average; SO = Strikeouts

Award winners
 Mike Krukow P, Willie Mac Award
All-Star Game

Farm system

LEAGUE CHAMPIONS: Fresno, Everett

References

External links
 1985 San Francisco Giants at Baseball Reference
 1985 San Francisco Giants at Baseball Almanac

San Francisco Giants seasons
San Francisco Giants season
San